Mohamed Kallon MOR (born 6 October 1979) is a Sierra Leonean football manager and former player who played as a striker. He is widely considered the most famous footballer from Sierra Leone. He made 39 appearances for the Sierra Leone national team during his career.

Kallon is the younger brother of former Sierra Leonean international footballers Kemokai Kallon and Musa Kallon.

Early life
Kallon was born on 6 October 1979 in Kenema, Sierra Leone. Kallon is the younger brother to former Sierra Leone international footballers Kemokai Kallon and Musa Kallon.  Mohamed Kallon attended primary school in Kenema and completed his secondary education at St. Edwards Secondary School in Freetown.

During his early international career for Sierra Leone, Kallon was given the nickname Small Kallon by Sierra Leonean football fans because he was the youngest of the three Kallon brothers in the Sierra Leone national team.

Club career

Early career
After he completed his form three levels of education (grade 9 in the U.S.) from St. Edwards Secondary School in Freetown in 1994, Kallon signed with the local club, Old Edwardians of the Sierra Leone National Premier League at the age of 15. During the 1994–95 season, he struck fifteen goals in 24 league games for Old Edwardians and became the youngest player to ever play and score in Sierra Leone National Premier League.

After the 1994–95 season, Kallon left Old Edwardians and signed for Lebanese club Tadamon Sour. He spent one season with Spånga IS in Stockholm, Sweden. He was then signed by Inter Milan. He was then loaned to Swiss Super League club AC Lugano, Serie A club Bologna F.C. 1909 and Cagliari, and Serie B clubs Genoa  He also farmed to Reggina and Vicenza in a co-ownership deal for an undisclosed fee and 9,000 billion lire respectively (€4,648,112). He played with Cristiano Zanetti at Cagliari, whom he later worked with again at Inter Milan.

Inter Milan

2001–02
After the abolition of the non-EU quota for each team halfway through the 2000–01 season, Kallon returned to Italian club Inter Milan before the start of the 2001–02 season., for a reported 8,500 billion lire transfer fee (€4,389,884). With Christian Vieri, Ronaldo, Álvaro Recoba, Adriano, Hakan Şükür and Nicola Ventola also in the side, Kallon was originally a third or fourth choice striker. But injuries to Ronaldo and Recoba meant that Kallon played 29 Serie A matches, scoring 9 goals and becoming the team's second highest scorer of the  2001–02 Serie A season, behind Vieri, as the club narrowly missed out on the league title, finishing in third place, also reaching the semi-finals of the UEFA Cup.

2002–03
He played nine times scoring five goals in Serie A in 2002–03 season due to injuries in August and February, as the team managed a second-place finish in the league. Kallon returned to the side in May after Gabriel Batistuta was injured in April. He also played both legs of the 2002–03 UEFA Champions League semi-final against A.C. Milan as Batistuta was unable to register. He played in both games as a second-half substitute, for Álvaro Recoba and Hernán Crespo respectively.

2003–04
Kallon tested positive for the banned substance nandrolone after the Serie A match against Udinese Calcio on 27 September 2003 and was banned from football for eight months. Kallon then struggled to get into the starting eleven during the 2003–04 season, primarily due to the rise of young Nigerian striker Obafemi Martins and the return of Brazilian ace Adriano.

Monaco
Kallon signed a four-year contract with Monégasque club AS Monaco before the start of the 2004–05 season, as the UEFA Champions League runners-up had lost Dado Pršo and Fernando Morientes. He was impressive during his first season at Monaco, but quickly fell out with French manager Didier Deschamps, and was relegated to the bench in March 2005.

He moved on loan to Saudi club Al-Ittihad on 29 July 2005. He helped the team win the 2005 AFC Champions League, leading the competition with six goals scored, including goals in each legs of the semi-final and final respectively. He also played at the 2005 FIFA Club World Championship with Al-Ittihad before returning to Monaco in 2006.

He played 12 Ligue 1 matches in his last full season with Monaco during the 2006–07 campaign. He played his last match in league play on 11 August 2007 against FC Lorient, the second match of the season, before he was released by Monaco. He underwent a trial with Birmingham in September 2007, after previously being linked with Derby County in July. However, Kallon failed to qualify for a work permit in England, as Sierra Leone ranked 79th in the FIFA World Rankings in September 1997, but the requirement was above 70th for non-EU internationals. In November 2007, he signed a pre-contract with Al Hilal, but this later collapsed.

AEK Athens
Kallon signed a six-month contract with Greek club AEK Athens on 29 January 2008. He played for the capital club in the UEFA Cup 2007–08 round of 32 against Getafe, but AEK lost 4–1 on aggregate, with no goals from Kallon. He also played in the Super League Greece playoffs to determine qualification to European competition. He scored once in his three appearances, and AEK finished second to qualify for the following year's UEFA Cup.

Greek fans remember him especially for an excellent goal against PAOK in a 4–0 win, when he scored with a chip shot outside the box.

Al-Shabab
He moved to Al-Shabab of the United Arab Emirates in 2008. He was released after picking up a serious injury in an international match.

Kallon FC
In October 2009, he signed for his own club Kallon FC.

Shaanxi Baorong Chanba
On 1 March 2010, he joined the Chinese championship, signing a one-year deal with Shaanxi Baorong Chanba. Kallon made his CSL debut against Dalian Shide on 28 March and scored a penalty kick in 50th minute.
He decided to leave after his contract was finished in December to be closer to his family.

He returned to Kallon F.C. ahead of the 2012 CAF Confederation Cup, and scored the winning goal that got them to the second round.

On 26 June 2014, was named the head coach of Sierra Leone u-17 side.

On 22 March 2016, he announced his retirement as a player, having last played in 2014.

International career
Kallon became the youngest player to ever play for the Leone Stars  when he made his senior international debut for Sierra Leone at the age of fifteen in April 1995 against Congo in the 1996 African Cup of Nations qualifier in Freetown, in which he  scored the winner. At the age of 16, Kallon was the youngest player at the 1996 African Nations cup in South Africa. He scored one of his country's two goals as Sierra Leone defeated Burkina Faso 2–1 in their opening group match at the 1996 African Nations Cup, played at the Free State Stadium in Bloemfontein, South Africa.

Since then, he is the key member of Leone Stars and active at 1998, 2002, 2006 and 2010 World Cup qualification. His most recent cap is on 9 February 2011 against Nigeria in a friendly. Kallon was the captain of the Sierra Leone national team but quit his captaincy after the team failed to qualify for the 2010 FIFA World Cup and the 2010 African Cup of Nations.

Club owner
Kallon is the founder and owner of the Sierra Leonean football club Kallon F.C., currently playing in the Sierra Leone National Premier League. Kallon is one of the top clubs in the Sierra Leone National Premier League and play their home games at the National Stadium in Freetown. Previously known as Sierra Fisheries, Kallon acquired the club in 2002 for $30,000.

Kallon FC won the Sierra Leonean FA Cup, and the Sierra Leone League title in 2006, and qualifying for the African Champions League.

Personal life
Mohamed Kallon is a devout Muslim and a member of the  Mandingo ethnic group. Kallon is married to his childhood girlfriend M'mah Mansaray. The couple celebrated their wedding at the Freetown Central Mosque in Freetown on 15 June 2002. Kallon is the younger brother of former Sierra Leonean international footballers Kemokai Kallon and Musa Kallon.

Mohamed Kallon Children's Foundation
Apart from the Kalleone Group of Company, comprising a musical recording studio, radio station, newspaper, sportshops, old Skool night club, pharmacy and FC Kallon, Mohamed Kallon is also about to launch his charity foundation, the MKCF, Mohamed Kallon Children's Foundation, which will cater for the needs of hundreds of Sierra Leone's street children. Recently Mohamed Kallon told SierraEye Magazine that as a boy himself who grew up in the streets of Freetown he is moved by the state of Sierra Leone Street Children and want to do all he can to help them. The foundation has made headways recently meeting with the president and working together with the United Nations and other NGOs to provide help for several Sierra Leonean children and also aiding the HIV/AIDS sensitisation programme in Sierra Leone. x The setting up of MKCF by Kallon gained massive media coverage and even the BBC reported on it.

Career statistics

Club

International

Scores and results list Sierra Leone's goal tally first, score column indicates score after each Kallon goal.

Honours
Al-Ittihad
AFC Champions League: 2005

Individual
AFC Champions League Top Scorer: 2005
Sierra Leone Order of the Rokel: 2013

References

External links
 
 
 

1979 births
Living people
People from Kenema
Mende people
Sierra Leonean footballers
Association football forwards
Old Edwardians F.C. players
Tadamon Sour SC players
Spånga IS players
FC Lugano players
Bologna F.C. 1909 players
Genoa C.F.C. players
Cagliari Calcio players
Reggina 1914 players
L.R. Vicenza players
Inter Milan players
AS Monaco FC players
Ittihad FC players
AEK Athens F.C. players
Al-Shaab CSC players
F.C. Kallon players
Beijing Renhe F.C. players
Lebanese Premier League players
Division 2 (Swedish football) players
Swiss Super League players
Serie A players
Serie B players
Ligue 1 players
Saudi Professional League players
Super League Greece players
UAE Pro League players
Chinese Super League players
Sierra Leone international footballers
1996 African Cup of Nations players
Association football coaches
Houston Dynamo FC non-playing staff
Sierra Leonean expatriate footballers
Sierra Leonean expatriate sportspeople in Lebanon
Sierra Leonean expatriate sportspeople in Sweden
Sierra Leonean expatriate sportspeople in Switzerland
Sierra Leonean expatriate sportspeople in Italy
Sierra Leonean expatriate sportspeople in France
Sierra Leonean expatriate sportspeople in Saudi Arabia
Sierra Leonean expatriate sportspeople in Greece
Sierra Leonean expatriate sportspeople in the United Arab Emirates
Sierra Leonean expatriate sportspeople in China
Sierra Leonean expatriate sportspeople in the United States
Expatriate footballers in Lebanon
Expatriate footballers in Sweden
Expatriate footballers in Switzerland
Expatriate footballers in Italy
Expatriate footballers in France
Expatriate footballers in Saudi Arabia
Expatriate footballers in Greece
Expatriate footballers in the United Arab Emirates
Expatriate footballers in China
Sierra Leonean sportspeople in doping cases
Doping cases in association football